"It's Not Right but It's Okay" is the third single from American singer Whitney Houston's fourth studio album, My Love Is Your Love. It was written by LaShawn Daniels, Rodney Jerkins, Fred Jerkins III, Isaac Phillips, Toni Estes, and produced by Darkchild. The song examines a woman confronting her lover about his infidelity. Houston won the 2000 Grammy Award for Best Female R&B Vocal Performance for this song. In 2003, Q Magazine ranked "It's Not Right but It's Okay" at number 638 in their list of the "1001 Best Songs Ever". The single reached number one in Spain and the top five in Canada, Iceland, the United Kingdom, and the United States.

Release
The original Rodney Jerkins production was released, but mainstream radio airplay and sales were given for the Thunderpuss Remix. The remixed version was released on Houston's 2000 Whitney: The Greatest Hits collection, and the original album version appears on 2007's The Ultimate Collection.

The Johnny Vicious remixes were included on the domestic CD maxi-single of "Heartbreak Hotel" as well as the on the import single and are currently available as iTunes downloads. The KCC remix was included on the US version of the "My Love Is Your Love" maxi-single and is also available as an iTunes download. Rodney Jerkins' remixes are the closest to the album version; Club 69 (Peter Rauhofer) also remixed the track for play in the UK. In the US, when it was released as a stand-alone single, the versions that appear are the Rodney Jerkins, Thunderpuss, and Club 69 remixes. There is also a ballad version, entitled "Smooth Mix".

Composition
"It's Not Right but It's Okay" is a R&B and neo soul song. According to the sheet music published at Musicnotes.com, it is written in the key of C minor with a tempo of 130 beats per minute. Houston's vocals span from G3 to A5 in the song.

Critical reception
Bill Lamb from About.com noted that the song is a "hard-hitting anthem for women on the way out of relationships that sounds great on the radio and on the dance floor." J.D. Considine from The Baltimore Sun wrote, "So when we hear her telling her abusive, less-than-faithful lover off in 'It's Not Right But It's Okay', we're not to imagine the lyrics have anything to do with the rumored infidelity of her real-life husband, Bobby Brown." Billboard magazine highlighted the song on Houston's album. Birmingham Evening Mail commented, "Houston, we have a problem. We loved your leather-limbed performance on the Brits of Rodney Jenkins' standout track from your new album 'My Love Is Your Love' and we know you should be cutting contemporary R&B - we just reckon you deserve better songs. Still, as a chart cert this'll do nicely, it's not great but it's okay." Matt Stopera and Brian Galindo from BuzzFeed noted on the Thunderpuss Remix, that "aside from being a essential gay dance floor classic, this track proves how a good remix can elevate a song from good to ICONIC." Daily Record stated, "Soul diva Whitney sounds streetwise with her biggest single since I Will Always Love You."

Chart performance
It became the album's third single, peaking at number four on the US Billboard Hot 100 singles chart on July 3, 1999. The single also peaked at number one on Billboards Hot Dance Music/Club Play chart, No. 7 on the top 100 Hot R&B/Hip-Hop Singles & Tracks chart, and was certified platinum by the RIAA. The song reached No. 3 in Canada, Iceland and the United Kingdom — in March 1999, where it stayed in the chart for 15 weeks, becoming a hugely popular radio hit in the country. And in Spain it peaked at No. 1.

Music video
The music video was directed by Kevin Bray.

Track listings

 UK CD1
 "It's Not Right but It's Okay" (Original Radio Mix) – 4:15
 "It's Not Right but It's Okay" (Club 69 Club Mix) – 7:58
 "It's Not Right but It's Okay" (Johnny Vicious Radio Mix) – 4:14

 UK CD2
 "It's Not Right but It's Okay" (Original Radio Mix) – 4:15
 "Step by Step" – 4:12
 "I'm Every Woman" – 4:47

 European maxi-single (The Dance Mixes)
 "It's Not Right but It's Okay" (Original Radio Mix) – 4:15
 "It's Not Right but It's Okay" (Club 69 Radio Mix) – 4:18
 "It's Not Right but It's Okay" (Johnny Vicious Radio Mix) – 4:25
 "It's Not Right but It's Okay" (Thunderpuss 2000 Club Mix) – 9:14

 12-inch vinyl
A1. "It's Not Right but It's Okay" (KCC's Release The Love Groove Mix) – 7:05
B1. "It's Not Right but It's Okay" (Club 69 Future Mix) – 8:02
B2. "It's Not Right but It's Okay" (Rodney Jerkins Smooth Mix) – 4:26

 12-inch vinyl (Thunderpuss 2000 Remixes)
A1. "It's Not Right but It's Okay" (Club Mix) – 9:15
A2. "It's Not Right but It's Okay" (Radio Mix) – 4:16
B1. "It's Not Right but It's Okay" (Thunderpuss Dub) – 8:19
B2. "It's Not Right but It's Okay" (Thunderpuss Beats) – 4:22

 US CD single
 "It's Not Right but It's Okay" (Original Radio Mix) – 4:15
 "It's Not Right but It's Okay" (Rodney Jerkins Smooth Mix) – 4:15
 "It's Not Right but It's Okay" (Thunderpuss Mix) – 4:11

 US maxi-single "It's Not Right but It's Okay" (Rodney Jerkins Smooth Mix) – 4:30
 "It's Not Right but It's Okay" (Rodney Jerkins Smooth Instrumental) – 4:30
 "It's Not Right but It's Okay" (Thunderpuss Radio Mix) – 4:18
 "It's Not Right but It's Okay" (Club 69 Radio Mix) – 4:21
 "It's Not Right but It's Okay" (Thunderpuss Club Mix) – 9:12
 "It's Not Right but It's Okay" (Club 69 Future Club Mix) – 8:05
 "It's Not Right but It's Okay" (Club 69 Future Dub) – 7:52
 "I Will Always Love You" (Hex Hector Club Mix) – 9:50 

 12-inch vinyl (Johnny Vicious Remixes)'A1. "It's Not Right but It's Okay" (Johnny Vicious Momentous Mix) – 13:03
B1. "It's Not Right but It's Okay" (Johnny Vicious Momentous Dub) – 8:31
B2. "It's Not Right but It's Okay" (Radio Mix) – 4:11

Charts

Weekly charts

Year-end charts

Certifications

Release history

Cover versions
The song was covered by Darren Criss on the hit Fox TV show Glee. Criss' character, Blaine, was confronting his own 'cheating' lover in the Whitney Houston tribute special, "Dance with Somebody". It was also covered on the "Lies" single and The Mother We Share EP'' by CHVRCHES. The song was heavily sampled in Mak & Pasteman's "It Ain't Right" and Shane Codd's "Rather Be Alone".

See also
 List of number-one singles of 1999 (Spain)
 List of number-one dance singles of 1999 (U.S.)

References

External links
 It's Not Right but It's Okay at Discogs

Whitney Houston songs
1998 songs
1999 singles
Arista Records singles
Bertelsmann Music Group singles
Neo soul songs
Number-one singles in Spain
Song recordings produced by Rodney Jerkins
Songs about infidelity
Songs written by Fred Jerkins III
Songs written by LaShawn Daniels
Songs written by Rodney Jerkins